"After Hours" is the first single from We Are Scientists's album Brain Thrust Mastery, released on CD and 7-inch vinyl on March 3, 2008. The music video for the track features actress Katrina Bowden and was directed by Akiva Schaffer. The song made it to number 15 on the UK singles chart, making it their highest charting single to date.

"After Hours" was featured in the 2008 film Nick and Norah's Infinite Playlist, as well as in trailers.

It was also featured in the video game Tony Hawk: Ride.

Track listing
7" #1
"After Hours"
"Dig Dug"

7" #2 (Picture Disc)
"After Hours"

CD
"After Hours"
"Best Behaviour"

Music Video 
The music video, which now has nearly 2,800,000 views, features a double date. A man, played by Chris Cain, believes that he is being set up with a friend of Keith Murray, only to find out that the friend is a dog. The video also features actress Katrina Bowden.

References

External links
 Official website
 What's The Word
 "After Hours" video

2008 singles
2008 songs
Virgin Records singles
We Are Scientists songs